Robert D. Luskin (born January 21, 1950) is an attorney and partner in the Washington office of the international law firm of Paul Hastings, LLP. He specializes in White-collar crime and federal and state government investigations. Luskin is also an adjunct professor of law at the Georgetown University Law Center, where he teaches a course in Global Anti-Corruption. Formerly, Luskin taught Advanced Criminal Law and Labor Racketeering at the University of Virginia School of Law.

Luskin is a graduate of Harvard University (B.A. degree, magna cum laude) and Harvard Law School (J.D. degree, magna cum laude), and a Rhodes Scholar at Oxford University. Before attending Harvard Law School, Luskin worked as the Deputy Chief of the Washington Bureau for the Providence Journal. Luskin took a leave of absence in 1984 to work as Senior Speechwriter for the campaign of Geraldine Ferraro. He worked in the US Department of Justice, specializing in Racketeer Influenced and Corrupt Organizations Act (RICO) enforcement, and helped supervise the ABSCAM investigation of the early 1980s. Since entering private practice, he has represented both witnesses and investigative targets in independent counsel, criminal, and congressional investigations, foreign corporations under FCPA investigation. In the course of his career, Luskin has argued not only in federal District Courts and numerous Courts of Appeal, but has also appeared before the United States Supreme Court. Luskin is admitted to the bars of the U.S. Supreme Court, the United States Court of Appeals for the 1st, 2nd, 4th, 5th, 6th, 7th, 8th, 9th, 11th Circuits, U.S. Court of Appeals for the D.C. Circuit, U.S. Court of Appeals for the Federal Circuit, and the U.S. District Court for the District of Columbia.

Practice 

Robert Luskin currently specializes in complex criminal and civil litigation at both the trial and appellate levels. Over the course of his career, he has represented foreign corporations, financial institutions, White House officials, cabinet secretaries, federal judges and members of Congress.

In 1995, Luskin successfully represented a sitting federal judge in a criminal appeal to the Supreme Court, resulting in a landmark case narrowing the construction of the general perjury statute.

In 2004, Luskin successfully represented the Assessor for Orange County, California in a Constitutional tax case involving $5–8 billion.

In 2003–09, Luskin represented White House senior advisor and chief political strategist Karl Rove, representing Rove in the special investigations into the outing of covert operative Valerie Plame's position within the Central Intelligence Agency (CIA) as a weapons of mass destruction (WMD) specialist.

Luskin was lead counsel for Lance Armstrong after the June 2012 allegations of blood doping by the US Anti-Doping Agency, a quasi-official American sports governing entity.

In 2019, Luskin represented Gordon Sondland, U.S. Ambassador to the EU, in the first impeachment proceedings involving Donald Trump.  Luskin was the subject of a front-page profile in the New York Times following Sondland's appearance in public testimony.

Since 2012, Luskin has focused on civil and criminal investigations under the Foreign Corrupt Practices Act, and has represented foreign corporations in several of the largest FCPA investigations ever resolved by the DOJ and SEC:, including multi-jurisdictional resolutions on behalf of Airbus, Goldman Sachs, Total, Alstom, SBM Offshore and Technip.

Luskin has won significant recognition for his efforts, and has been hailed as a “dean of the FCPA bar” by Chambers USA.  In 2021, Luskin was recognized as “White Collar Lawyer of the Year” by Chambers USA and was named a “White Collar MVP” by Law360 in addition to having spent the better part of the last decade atop the Chambers USA rankings in his areas of practice.  The Global Investigations Review has identified Bob as one of 20 elite practitioners worldwide in the area of anti-corruption and recently also recognized Luskin as a “Global Thought Leader.”

Pulitzer Prize-winning journalist James B. Stewart singled out Luskin as a lawyer who, unlike most criminal lawyers, was prepared to be candid with prosecutors, not permit his client to lie, and come forward with information. Stewart wrote further: "These cases also illustrate that criminal defense lawyers have much to answer for. To his credit, Rove's lawyer Robert Luskin promptly revealed a damaging e-mail and had Rove amend his earlier testimiony that he didn't speak to Time's Matt Cooper. But other defense lawyers allowed their clients to lie in circumstances where they knew or should have known they were doing so."

Fee Forfeiture 

In 1997, US Attorney Sheldon Whitehouse of Rhode Island accused Luskin of "willful blindness" for accepting $505,125 in gold bars as well as Swiss Wire transfers of $169,000 from Stephen Saccoccia, after Luskin represented Saccoccia post-conviction. Whitehouse argued that Saccoccia's payments to Luskin were related to Saccoccia's broad money-laundering scheme and that the money should be returned to the government. The Court of Appeals for the First Circuit considered Whitehouse's forfeiture claims in two separate opinions and both times ruled that there was no basis to seek forfeitures from Saccoccia's attorneys.

William Moffitt, VP of the National Association of Defense Lawyers, supported Luskin: "if the case gets a high profile [or] they don't like the lawyer in it, they can immediately open this kind of assault," adding  "if you plead your client guilty, they're never going to go after your fee. So there's an incentive here to give the government what it wants."

In 1998, Luskin settled with the government, forfeiting $245,000 in fees. Whitehouse, on the other hand, went on to lose his 2002 gubernatorial bid due to civil rights controversies  during his tenure as State Attorney General.

Personal life

Despite representing President Bush's top political advisor Karl Rove, EU Ambassador Sondland, and other senior Republican officials, Luskin is a proud Democrat and has donated to numerous Democratic causes.  A Washington Post profile in 2011 described him as a "man of somewhat Neiman-Marxist tastes".

In 1995, Luskin was surprised to find himself described as the first male lawyer to wear an earring while arguing a case before the Supreme Court, before clarifying that if he believed that the earring would ever adversely affect his client's interests, then it would be "out in a flash."

Luskin splits his time between West Tisbury, MA, and Washington, D.C.. Luskin often rides his motorcycle to work when in Washington. For longer trips, Luskin, an experienced pilot, will fly his Cirrus SF50 Vision Jet.

Luskin is married and has two sons and two step daughters. Luskin's step-daughters are currently in graduate school, while his sons are working: one is based in the Middle East, where he founded a company that supports international aid organizations operating in conflict zones; the other is a lawyer in private practice on Martha's Vineyard.

See also 
 Plame affair
 RICO
 FCPA

References

External links 
Official Biography at Patton Boggs
The Liberal on Karl Rove's Case
Robert Luskin Receives 45 Gold Bars From Stolen Assets

American legal scholars
American Rhodes Scholars
Alumni of University College, Oxford
Harvard Law School alumni
Lawyers from Chicago
1950 births
Living people
People associated with the Plame affair
Paul Hastings partners
Harvard College alumni